In college football, 2021 NCAA football bowl games may refer to:

2020–21 NCAA football bowl games, for games played in January 2021 as part of the 2020 season.
2021–22 NCAA football bowl games, for games played in December 2021 as part of the 2021 season.